Trimsaran United Rugby Football Club is a rugby union team from the village of Trimsaran in South Wales.  The club is a member of the Welsh Rugby Union and is a feeder club for the Llanelli Scarlets.

Club badge
The club badge is a shield split into quarters with the club name in scrolls around it. Two of the quarters show the team's colours of emerald green and black in stripes. The third quarter features the entry bridge to Trismaran, Pont Spwdwr, thought to be the oldest Norman bridge in Wales. The final segment holds the Prince of Wales's feathers.

Notable former players
 Jonathan Davies
 Nigel Davies (29 caps)
 Les Williams (7 caps)

References

External links
Trimsaran RFC

Welsh rugby union teams
Sport in Carmarthenshire